Goose Island is one of the San Juan Islands in San Juan County, Washington, United States.

Characteristics
The uninhabited island is only 3.789 acres (1.533 ha), and is located at latitude 48° 27' 29" N, longitude 122° 57' 19" W, off the southeastern tip of San Juan Island, in the channel between that island and Lopez Island.

Nature Conservancy preserve
Since 1975 it has been managed as a nature preserve by The Nature Conservancy, following the Management Plan and Baseline Study for Goose and Deadman Island Preserves, along with Deadman Island. Visiting the island is prohibited, except for researchers from the University of Washington's Friday Harbor Laboratories.

References
Goose Island: Block 3032, Census Tract 9603, San Juan County, Washington United States Census Bureau

External links

San Juan Islands
Protected areas of San Juan County, Washington
Uninhabited islands of Washington (state)